Duckinwilla is a rural locality in the Fraser Coast Region, Queensland, Australia. In the  Duckinwilla had a population of 12 people.

Geography 
Duckinwilla is mostly forested; much of it is in the Wongi State Forest. There is some cleared land used for farming, but no urban area. 

The Bruce Highway passes from south to north through the eastern part of the locality.

In the centre of the locality is Lake Lenthall, created by damming the Burrum River.

History
The earliest European settler in the district was Eli Lenthall, a timbergetter. Lake Lenthall is named after him.

Duckinwilla Creek State School opened on 24 August 1936 and closed in 1953.

In the 2011 census, Duckinwilla had a population of 10 people.

In the  Duckinwilla had a population of 12 people.

Heritage listings
Duckinwilla has a number of heritage-listed sites, including:
 Warrah Road: Allan Slab Hut

Education 
There are no schools in Duckinwilla. The nearest primary schools are Howard State School in neighbouring Howard to north-east and Sunbury State School in Maryborough to the south-east. The nearest secondary schools are Isis District State High School in Childers to the north-west and Aldridge State High School in the Maryborough.

Attractions 
Lake Lenthall has picnic grounds, camping, and a boat ramp, all at the end of Lenthall Dam Road. It is managed by the Fraser Coast Regional Council.

Wongi Waterholes is a picnic and camping area in the Wongi State Forest, noted for its abundant wildlife. It is accessed from the Kellogum Forestry Road off Warrah Road. There are a number of viewing platforms around the waterholes:

 Wongi Waterhole 1 Viewing Platform
 Wongi Waterhole 2 Viewing Platform
 Wongi Waterhole 3 Viewing Platform
 Wongi Waterhole 4 & 5 Viewing Platform

In popular culture 
Duckinwilla is also referenced by songwriter Chad Morgan in the song, Duckinwilla Dance.

References

External links 

Wide Bay–Burnett
Fraser Coast Region
Localities in Queensland